Festival fantazie is the largest festival of speculative fiction in the Czech Republic and one of the largest in Central and Eastern Europe. As for number of particular programs it surpasses the longest running science fiction convention Worldcon. In this sense Festival fantazie belongs among the biggest festivals of its kind in the world. In 2007 the festival was visited by 2135 individuals, who stayed for 5 days on average, Festival fantazie Speciál in autumn entertained 640 participants.

Festival is devoted to fantasy and wide spectrum of related subjects. The program includes films literature, games, it is focused on science fiction and future, astronomy, modern technologies, fantasy, horror, mythology, mysteries, military and history. Visitors are offered the opportunity to see films and TV shows, take part in large number of games and contests of all kinds. Furthermore, meetings with famous personalities, both vocational and humorous lectures, theatre and fencing performances are organized and much more.

Festival has been held in Chotěboř every year since 1996 in June and July. Shorter Festival Fantazie Speciál takes place in October. The organizer is independent non-profit civic organization SFK Avalon. Václav Pravda is the festival director.

Program 
Program runs in several parallel program lines. Lines come under program sections which may also be parallel:

 Festival fantazie – the main program, special programs
 Festival Járy Cimrmana – Jára Cimrman and other art and science geniuses
 Avalcon – literary branch
 GameFest – free gaming

The core of the festival consists of meetings with well-known writers, actors and artists and both vocational and humorous speeches, presentations (by specialists or fans), panel discussions. Visitors have opportunity to see both the newest films and films which are not commonly available, TV shows or documentary films. Fan activities include fanfilms and dramatic performances among others.

A computer hall (with network games, Wii consoles) is prepared within the GameFest block. Board games, card games, table role-playing games are available. Live action role-playing games (LARP) are run. Competitions and tournaments are organized in many games.

In 2007 the program included over 1200 activities and events. That is more than Worldcon 2006 had (1057 events).

The festival organizers allow groups of fans to realize their own programs. This very good cooperation with participants provides basis for richer program than other similar events have. Small conventions often give up after few years while Festival fantazie offers its services and organizational support for further sequels of convention under patronage of the festival.

Program lines 
This is a list of program lines at Festival fantazie. Note that links to the lines' webpages are mostly in Czech.

Additional program 
Many other activities are held out of main program lines. Table football or Dance Dance Revolution are available, films are projected in cinema. Events such as expositions, concerts, dramatic performances, fencing shows, ceremonial party with masquerade competition and raffle, beauty contest, literary workshop or book (and DVD, CD, VHS) exchange are held in terms of the festival.

Many contests and tournaments belong to the additional program among others. These contests are often organized by festival visitors themselves (e.g. table football or staring tournament).

Speciál 
Festival fantazie Speciál is a happening tied to Festival fantazie which is organized by SFK Avalon too. Speciál is linked with the summer festival, chosen programs appear again, but it offers variety of original program. Speciál is aimed to satisfy fans who prefer a smaller event to bustle of a large one or who missed desired program of Festival fantazie and also to enable further socializing across various interest groups.

Guests 
These guests confirmed attendance for Festival fantazie 2007:

 Harry Harrison – American science fiction writer
 Magdalena Kozak – Polish doctor and writer
 Andrzej Pilipiuk – Polish archaeologist and writer
 Nikolaj Reďka – Ukrainian painter
 David Nykl – Canadian actor of Czech origin (character of Dr. Zelenka in Stargate Atlantis
 Ondrej Herec – Slovak literary theorist, translator, organizer
 Jan Kantůrek – Czech translator (e.g. Discworld by Terry Pratchett)
 Jiří Kocman – Czech dubber
 Pavol Martinický – Slovak architect, artist, publicist
 Miloslav Mejzlík – Czech dubber (e.g. Jack O'Neill in Stargate SG-1)
 Jaroslav Mostecký – Czech writer, collector, moderator
 Ondřej Neff – Czech spisovatel, script-writer, publicist, founder of Ikarie magazine and internet journal Neviditelný pes
 Anežka Pohorská – Czech dubber
 Jiří W. Procházka – Czech writer (e.g. John Francis Kovář series)
 Jiří Samek – Czech actor, dubber (e.g. George Hammond in Stargate SG-1)
 Františka Vrbenská – Czech writer
 Miroslav Žamboch – Czech writer (e.g. John Francis Kovář series)

New events 
List of recent festival innovations:

 More program lines: SeriesCon, LOSTcon, MysteryCon, DozorCon, SpyCon, The Witsher, ChinaCon, Klasikon, SithCon, ANImera, InfantilCon, CultCon, FireFly marathon.
 Program runs 24 hours a day – NightCon offers computer games, board and card games, film projections
 Fantasy LARPs The Witcher: Baptism of fire and Battle of the Hornburg, OrcBall, Orc olympiad
 Eight days' paintball program, bicycles and sport equipment rental
 Festival journal, daily FanTV interviews with notable persons
 First official festival wedding (Star Trek style)

Background 
Festival provides organizers and attendees with reliable background. The centre is located in House of Culture Junior with halls and lecture rooms for circa 400 attendees. A snack bar, tearoom and workshop are situated here too. In proximate neighbourhood there are Druzba Cinema (capacity for 200–300 visitors), Sport Hall (for 190 visitors) and Sokolovna (for 200–400 visitors, snack bar, wine bar).

Accommodation is prepared in several categories from hotel to sleeping-bag places. The maximum capacity includes 13 buildings (Guest-house Bene, Filippi hotel, U Zámku hotel, Vyočina hotel, Business Academy hostel, Special boarding school, Sport hall, Smetanova and Buttulova elementary schools etc.).

Visitors have access to the Internet through festival computers or they can browse festival Wi-Fi network.

History 

SFK Avalon Club, predecessor of organization in charge of the festival, was founded 12 February 1994. Among its first activities it issued Zbraně Avalonu magazine or organized Corwinovy spisy contest or brutal short stories competition. In 1996 it failed in candidacy for Parcon organization and decided to make Avalcon, convention of its own which was realized twice. In 1998 SFK Avalon led Parcon with 470 visitors, Avalon's co-founder Václav Pravda was elected a member of Czech Fandom Council. Three years of Festival fantazie Avalcon and two Avalcon Speciáls (1999, 2002) followed with increasing visit rate and extending program. At Eurocon 2000 in Gdynia Avalon succeeded in candidacy for Eurocon 2002 in Chotěboř.

In 2001 the independent civic organization SFK Avalon was founded by the festival organizers. Their Eurocon 2002 was visited by 1300 attendees for whom 250 programs, 125 projections and GameCon was prepared. Despite accommodation difficulties Film Festival Fantazie connected with FF Parcon-Avalcon, FF GameStar and Literary Festival Vysočina started on 28 June 2003. Festival fantazie together with Festival fantazie Speciál in autumn (formerly Avalcon Speciál) is held annually ever since.

Festival budget got from debt in 2006. Visit rate is increasing every year, program extent is growing and the festival is planned for at least 2 following years.

See also 
 Science fiction convention
 Worldcon
 Chotěboř
 Fantasy
 Science fiction

References

External links
 
 Chotěboř today at Chotěboř official website

Science fiction organizations
Science fiction conventions in Europe
Recurring events established in 1996
Film festivals in the Czech Republic
Literary festivals in the Czech Republic
Comics conventions
Summer events in the Czech Republic